Mitochondrial ribosomal protein L3 is a protein that in humans is encoded by the MRPL3 gene.

Mammalian mitochondrial ribosomal proteins are encoded by nuclear genes and help in protein synthesis within the mitochondrion. Mitochondrial ribosomes (mitoribosomes) consist of a small 28S subunit and a large 39S subunit. They have an estimated 75% protein to rRNA composition compared to prokaryotic ribosomes, where this ratio is reversed. Another difference between mammalian mitoribosomes and prokaryotic ribosomes is that the latter contain a 5S rRNA. Among different species, the proteins comprising the mitoribosome differ greatly in sequence, and sometimes in biochemical properties, which prevents easy recognition by sequence homology. This gene encodes a 39S subunit protein that belongs to the L3P ribosomal protein family. A pseudogene corresponding to this gene is found on chromosome 13q. [provided by RefSeq, Jul 2008].

Clinical relevance
Mutations in this gene have been shown to cause mitochondrial cardiomyopathy.

References

Further reading

External links 
 

Ribosomal proteins